Minto Parish is one of the 57 parishes of Cumberland County, New South Wales, a cadastral unit for use on land titles. It includes Minto, Ingleburn, Glenfield and Macquarie Fields. Its eastern boundary is the Georges River, and western boundary was at the Great Southern Road.

References

Parishes of Cumberland County
1835 establishments in Australia